Nicolae Lupu may refer to:

Nicolae Gh. Lupu (1884–1966), Romanian physician
Nicolae L. Lupu (1876–1947), Romanian politician and physician